Le Châtellier (Gallo: Le Chastelier) is a commune in the Ille-et-Vilaine department in Brittany in northwestern France.

Population
Inhabitants of Le Châtellier are called Castellérois or Castellégiens in French.

Horticulture
 

The Botanical garden of Upper Brittany is located in Le Châtellier.

See also
Communes of the Ille-et-Vilaine department

References

External links

Mayors of Ille-et-Vilaine Association 

Communes of Ille-et-Vilaine